Tridecoder is the debut studio album by German electronic music band Lali Puna. It was released on 1 September 1999 by Darla Records, Hausmusik and Morr Music.

Track listing

Personnel
Credits are adapted from the album's liner notes.

Lali Puna
 Valerie Trebeljahr – vocals, keyboards, sampler
 Markus Acher – bass, keyboards, sampler
 Christoph Brandner – drums, electronic drums, sampler
 Florian Zimmer – keyboards, sampler

Production
 Rashad Becker – mastering
 Albert Pöschl – mixing, recording
 Mario Thaler – mixing

Design
 Jan Kruse – cover artwork

References

External links
 

1999 debut albums
Lali Puna albums
Darla Records albums
Morr Music albums